Yedemachindra is a village in Walwa taluka in Sangli district of Maharashtra

This village is the birth village of Kranti Singh Nana Patil and there is a memorial in the village. The village has a statue of Kranti Singh and has a high school named after him.

References 

Villages in Sangli district